Jamiatul Uloom Al-Islamia Lalkhan Bazar, popularly known as Lalkhan Bazar Madrasah, is a well-known Qawmi madrasah situated in the Lalkhan Bazar area of port city Chittagong. The jamia is founded by Mufti Izharul Islam.

Education system
The Lalkhan Bazar Madrasah offers the students Islamic education from the very initial stage up to the highest level. It also offers Specialization (equivalent to a PhD) to the students who have successfully completed Takmil (MA).

Departments
 Department of Hifzul Qur'an
 Department of Fatwaa (Dar al-Ifta)
 Madrasa-tul-Banat (Female Section)

Network of madrasahs
Lalkhan Bazar Madrasah is one of the three large madrasahs — along with Darul Uloom Muinul Islam in Hathazari and Al-Jamiah Al-Islamiah in Patiya — that together control over 7,000 smaller schools in Bangladesh. The three schools are closely coordinated.

References

Further reading

External links 
 Darul Ulooms, Jamiyas and Qaumi Madrasahs Worldwide

Qawmi madrasas of Bangladesh
Deobandi Islamic universities and colleges
Islamic universities and colleges in Bangladesh